The animated television series The Real Ghostbusters premiered on ABC on September 13, 1986. It continued airing weekly until the series conclusion on October 5, 1991. After the first season aired, the series entered syndication, during which new episodes aired each weekday. 65 episodes aired in syndication simultaneously with the official second season in 1987. At the start of the third season in 1988, the show was renamed to Slimer! and the Real Ghostbusters and expanded to an hour-long time slot, during which the regular 30-minute episode aired along with a half-hour Slimer! sub-series which included two to three short animated segments focused on the character Slimer and returned to ABC. At the end of its seven-season run, 173 episodes had aired, including the syndicated episodes and 13 episodes of Slimer!, with multiple episodes airing out of production order.

Sony Pictures Entertainment released several DVD volumes of the show in North America in 2006. They include random episodes and no extras. Time-Life released the complete series in a single 25-disc box-set collection on November 25, 2008. The discs were packed in five plastic or steelbook volumes, housed in a box modeled on the Ghostbusters' firehouse, a design chosen in a fan vote. Beginning the next year, the separate volumes were released on their own, first in the United States. Sony only released a 2-disc set featuring all 13 episodes from Season 1 in Australia and the UK.

Sony later released most of the series on individual disc volumes in 2016 (the first 5 volumes were also made available in a boxed bundle). In October 2017, the entire collection of all 10 volumes was released in a 10-disc box set. It was not complete as 29 episodes, or approximately 20% of the series, was omitted. No extras were included, and several episodes were modified in that their opening title cards were removed. Some of this box set's missing episodes from earlier seasons are found on Sony's 2006 (out-of-print) DVD releases.

Every episode of the series (including Slimer! and the Real Ghostbusters) was released in 2018 through both a 21-disc DVD and 3-disc Blu-ray (non upscaled transfers) by German distributor Turbine, including both English and German audio tracks.

With the exception of the syndicated episodes, all the others are arranged in airing order.

Series overview

Episodes

The Real Ghostbusters

Season 1 (1986; ABC Season 1)

Season 2 (1987; syndication)

Season 3 (1987; ABC Season 2)

Slimer! and the Real Ghostbusters

Season 4 (1988; ABC Season 3)

Season 5 (1989; ABC Season 4)

Season 6 (1990; ABC Season 5)

Season 7 (1991; ABC Season 6)

Slimer! sub-series (1988)

Crossover special (1990)

Sony DVD release  
From July 5 to September 6, 2016, Sony Pictures Home Entertainment have released most of the series (approximately 80% complete) in 10 volumes. A total of 29 episodes are missing throughout this release of the series, leaving all seasons incomplete with the exception of Season 4. Season 7, as well as the Slimer! sub-series, is omitted entirely.

Notes

References 

Episodes
Real Ghostbusters